George Murphy "Pops" Foster (May 19, 1892 – October 30, 1969) was an American jazz musician, best known for his vigorous slap bass playing of the string bass. He also played the tuba and trumpet professionally.

Biography
Foster was born to Charley and Annie Foster, who "was nearly fullblooded Cherokee," on a plantation near McCall in Ascension Parish near Donaldsonville in south Louisiana, United States. His family moved to New Orleans when he was about 10 years of age. His older brother, Willard Foster, began playing banjo and guitar; George started out on a cello then switched to string bass. Foster married twice: to Bertha Foster in 1912 and Alma Foster in 1936.

Pops Foster was playing professionally by 1907 and worked with Jack Carey, Kid Ory, Armand Piron, King Oliver and other prominent hot bands of the era. In 1921, he moved to St. Louis, Missouri, to play with the Charlie Creath and Dewey Jackson bands, in which he would be active for much of the decade. He also joined Ory in Los Angeles. He acquired the nickname "Pops" because he was far older than any of the other players in the band.

In 1929, Foster moved to New York City, where he played with the bands of Luis Russell and Louis Armstrong through 1940. He gigged with New York-based bands through the 1940s, including those of Sidney Bechet, Art Hodes, and regularly participated in the national This Is Jazz radio program. He recorded with the Mezzrow-Bechet Quintet (Bechet, Mezz Mezzrow, Fitz Weston, and Kaiser Marshall) and Septet (on two consecutive dates in 1945, with Hot Lips Page (as Pappa Snow White), Sammy Price (as Jimmy Blythe Jr.), Danny Barker and Sid Catlett, and on the second session with Pleasant Joe on vocals).

In the late 1940s, he began touring more widely and played in many countries in Europe, especially in France, and throughout the United States including returns to New Orleans and California.

In 1952, Foster toured Europe with Jimmy Archey's Band. He played regularly at Central Plaza in New York and briefly in New Orleans with Papa Celestin in 1954.

In the late 1950s and early 1960s, he played with Earl Hines' Small Band. In 1966, he toured Europe with the New Orleans All-Stars but remained based in San Francisco, where he died.

The Autobiography of Pops Foster was published in 1971, with a new edition in 2005. Foster is quoted, "Some of the books are fouled up on the times in New Orleans", "and some of the guys weren't telling the truth." "The critics and guys who write about jazz think they know more about what went on in New Orleans than the guys that were there."

Gallery

References

Bibliography
"George Murphy 'Pops' Foster", A Dictionary of Louisiana Biography, Vol. 1 (1988), p. 315
John Chilton, Who's Who of Jazz: Storyville to Swing Street (1972)

External links

Pops Foster (1892-1968) at the Red Hot Jazz Archive
 Pops Foster recordings at the Discography of American Historical Recordings.

American jazz double-bassists
Male double-bassists
Jazz musicians from Louisiana
People from Ascension Parish, Louisiana
1892 births
1969 deaths
American jazz tubists
American male jazz musicians
American jazz trumpeters
American male trumpeters
20th-century American musicians
20th-century trumpeters
Slap bassists (double bass)
American people of Cherokee descent
20th-century double-bassists
20th-century American male musicians
The Eagle Band members
Southland Records artists
20th-century African-American musicians